George Edward Newell (last name possibly Newall) was a Michigan politician.  He was a member of the Masons, the Grand Army of the Republic and a Knight of the Maccabbes.

Early life
Newall was born to Thomas and Sarah (Bowden) Newall on September 18, 1842 in Flushing, Genesee County.  His family move to Flint while he was young.  At age fourteen, he left school to work in a planing mill.  He served in the Civil War as a Lieutenant of Company A, Eighth Michigan Infantry from June 19, 1861 to September 10, 1862.  He was a captain until March 9, 1863.  In 1863, he married Sarah H. Freeman, with whom he had two sons.

Political life
Newell entered public service as Flint's Postmaster and held the position of School Director and city supervisor of Flint's First Ward.  He was elected as the Mayor of the City of Flint in 1883 serving a 1-year term.

Post-Political life
Newall died on September 10, 1916.

References

Mayors of Flint, Michigan
1842 births
1916 deaths
Michigan postmasters
19th-century American politicians